Charles Elbert Dow (1846 – November 19, 1914) was a Republican mayor of South Norwalk, Connecticut from 1903 to 1907. He was elected with the endorsement of both parties.

He was the son of John and Margaret Dow of New York. He married Mary O. Randall.

He enlisted from Danbury on September 7, 1864, in the Union Army during the American Civil War and served with Company B, 17th Connecticut Infantry Regiment and was discharged on July 19, 1865. He was a private.

References

1846 births
1914 deaths
Connecticut Republicans
Mayors of Norwalk, Connecticut
Union Army soldiers
19th-century American politicians